Luce may refer to:

People 
 Luce (name), as a given name and a surname
 Luce (singer)

Places 
 Luče, a town in Slovenia
 Luce, Minnesota, an unincorporated community
 Luce Bay, a large Bay in Wigtownshire in southern Scotland
 Luce County, Michigan, a county in the U.S. state of Michigan
 Luce Township, Spencer County, Indiana
 New Luce, village in the Scottish unitary council area of Dumfries and Galloway
 Sainte-Luce, Martinique, a commune in the French overseas département of Martinique
 Sainte-Luce, Isère, a commune in the Isère department in south-eastern France
 Santa Luce, a commune in the Province of Pisa in the Italian region Tuscany
 Water of Luce, a river in Dumfries and Galloway, in south west Scotland

Other 
 Luce (band), a rock band from San Francisco
 Luce (film), a 2019 film
 "Luce (tramonti a nord est)", Italian singer Elisa's most famous song
 Istituto Luce, historic Italian film institute
 Esox lucius, a fish of the northern hemisphere, also known as Pike or Luce
 Luce's choice axiom, an axiom in probability theory
 Luce Hall, the first, purpose-built building for the U.S. Naval War College, in Newport, Rhode Island
 , various United States Navy ships
 Luce–Celler Act of 1946
 Mazda Luce, a Japanese luxury vehicle

See also 
 Lucé (disambiguation)
 Luci
 Lucia (disambiguation)
 Lucie (disambiguation)
 Lucy (disambiguation)
 Lucey (disambiguation)
 Luzi